Nino Žugelj (born 23 May 2000) is a Slovenian football midfielder who plays for Eliteserien side Bodø/Glimt.

Club career
Žugelj made his senior debut for Maribor on 23 February 2019 in the Slovenian PrvaLiga match against Mura, before spending time on loan at Drava Ptuj and Bravo. He scored his first goal for Maribor on 8 July 2021 against Urartu in the UEFA Europa Conference League qualifiers.

On 1 August 2022, Žugelj joined Eliteserien side Bodø/Glimt for an alleged transfer fee of around €700,000.

References

External links
Nino Žugelj at Soccerway

2000 births
Living people
Slovenian footballers
Association football midfielders
Slovenia youth international footballers
Slovenia under-21 international footballers
NK Maribor players
NK Drava Ptuj (2004) players
NK Bravo players
FK Bodø/Glimt players
Slovenian PrvaLiga players
Slovenian Second League players
Eliteserien players
Slovenian expatriate footballers
Slovenian expatriate sportspeople in Norway
Expatriate footballers in Norway